

The Lowe Marlburian was a 1920s British two-seat monoplane design by F. Harold Lowe.

Design and development
The Marlburian was a two-seat braced monoplane powered by a Gnome rotary engine. It was built during 1921 by Lowe at Heaton near Newcastle upon Tyne. The seventh aircraft built by a 20-year-old Lowe, it took 840 hours to build the aircraft, with everything but the engine, wheels, propeller and instruments being made from raw materials. The two occupants sat side by side. It was registered G-EBEX on 7 October 1922, the aircraft crashed on 25 November 1922.

Specifications

References

Notes

Bibliography

1920s British civil utility aircraft
Aircraft first flown in 1922
High-wing aircraft
Rotary-engined aircraft
Single-engined tractor aircraft